Kadri may refer to:

People
 Kadri (name), a personal name

Places
 Kadri, Mangalore, a neighbourhood in Mangalore, India

See also
 Kadiri, a place of Hindu pilgrimage in Andhra Pradesh, India
 Balakadri, form of traditional music on the Caribbean island of Guadeloupe
 Qadiriyyah, subgroup of Islamic dervishes